Take Heart is the debut studio album by Singaporean pop band The Sam Willows, released on 30 October 2015 through Sony Music Entertainment Singapore.

Production 
The band travelled to Stockholm, Sweden to record the 9-track album with producer Harry Sommerdahl.

Release and promotion 
On 30 October 2015, the band released the album and started promoting the album around Southeast Asia. The Sam Willows played a live concert in Kuala Lumpur, which was sold out and another solo show in Manila, Philippines on top of their opening act for Little Mix's Get Weird Tour 2016.

In July 2016, the quartet's very own concert in Singapore at The Coliseum was sold out.

Commercial performance 
The first two singles from the album, "Take Heart" and "For Love", each debuted at number one on the Singapore iTunes chart.

Take Heart was certified Gold in recognition of sales in September 2016.

Track listing

References

2015 albums
The Sam Willows albums